Jon Paul Preston (born 15 November 1967) is a former New Zealand rugby union player. He was a member of the New Zealand national side, the All Blacks, from 1991 to 1997, playing 27 matches for the team, including 10 internationals.

References

1967 births
Living people
Rugby union players from Dunedin
People educated at St Bede's College, Christchurch
Rugby union scrum-halves
Rugby union fly-halves
New Zealand rugby union players
New Zealand international rugby union players
Canterbury rugby union players
Wellington rugby union players
Hurricanes (rugby union) players
Bath Rugby players
New Zealand expatriate sportspeople in England
New Zealand expatriate rugby union players
Expatriate rugby union players in England